WLKS (1450 AM) was a radio station broadcasting an oldies format. Established in 1965 and licensed to West Liberty, Kentucky, United States, the station was owned by Morgan County Industries, Inc. and featured programming from Westwood One. WLKS surrendered its license on April 11, 2017.

References

External links
FCC Station Search Details: DWLKS (Facility ID: 43786)
 (covering 1964-1981)

LKS
Defunct radio stations in the United States
Radio stations established in 1965
1965 establishments in Kentucky
Radio stations disestablished in 2017
2017 disestablishments in Kentucky
LKS
West Liberty, Kentucky